The 2019 Memorial Van Damme was the 43rd edition of the annual track and field meeting in Brussels, Belgium. Held on 5–6 September at the King Baudouin Stadium, it was the fourteenth leg of the 2019 IAAF Diamond League – the highest level international track and field circuit – and the second half of the final for 2019 (the first half being held during the Weltklasse Zürich in Zürich, Switzerland on 29 August). It was the tenth and last edition of the meet to co-host the Diamond League final with the Weltklasse Zürich; The Weltklasse Zürich will exclusively host the final in 2020.

Because of the late World Athletics Championships, the Diamond League final was for the first time held before the World Athletics Championships in the same year. 16 Diamond League champions (8 men and 8 women) were determined and received wild cards to compete at the 2019 World Athletics Championships. 18 more events were contested outside the Diamond League.

Diamond League champions

Diamond League results

Men

Women

Non-Diamond League results

Men

Women

Boys

Girls

See also
2019 Weltklasse Zürich (previous meet and first half of the final in the 2019 IAAF Diamond League)

References

Results
Results AG Memorial Van Damme. IAAF Diamond League (6 September 2019). Retrieved 19 February 2020.

External links
Official Diamond League Memorial Van Damme website

2019
Memorial Van Damme
Memorial Van Damme